Sulphur is an unincorporated community in Union Township, Crawford County, Indiana.

Sulphur contained the White Sulphur Well which was noted for the quality of the mineral water it produced.

Geography

References

External links

Unincorporated communities in Crawford County, Indiana
Unincorporated communities in Indiana